Çıplak can refer to:

 Çıplak Island
 Çıplak, Çanakkale